Mary Lum Girard (1758–1815) Mary Lum (otherwise known as Mary Girard) is known for being the wife of banker, philanthropist and merchant millionaire Stephen Girard.

Mary Lum was born in 1758, the daughter of a local Philadelphia shipbuilder. In 1776, at the young age of 18, Mary met and began to court Stephen Girard and eventually they married. Shortly after getting married in 1777, Mary and her new husband purchased a home at 211 Mill Street in Mount Holly Township, New Jersey. There they lived and established a store selling sundry items to the locals, at the same time selling provisions to the American revolutionaries. They soon moved back to Philadelphia, where their business flourished.

However, in early 1785, Mary exhibited prolonged periods of uncontrolled emotional outbursts. Mental instability accompanied by violent rage over time led to a conclusion that Mary Lum Girard was insane. They had been married but eight years. After five years of attempts at recovery, in August 1790, Stephen Girard committed Mary to the insanity ward in the basement of Pennsylvania Hospital, then Philadelphia's only institution for the insane, citing she was an "incurable lunatic". At the time of commitment, Mary was pregnant. It is not known for sure who the father was, however, it is known that the baby girl was born while Mary was still confined at Pennsylvania Hospital and died five months after birth.

Mary Lum Girard resided at the Pennsylvania Hospital insanity ward for twenty-five years until her death on September 15, 1815. She was fifty-six years old. She was afforded the best care that could be provided at that time, despite the difficulty in understanding and treating the illness that plagued her. In accordance with her husband's wishes, Mary Lum Girard was laid to rest on the grounds of the Pennsylvania Hospital, her grave site unmarked and unadorned.

References

External links
http://www.ushistory.org/people/girard.htm
https://www.amazon.com/dp/0573622272

1758 births
1815 deaths
People from Mount Holly, New Jersey
People from Philadelphia
People of colonial Pennsylvania
Burials in Pennsylvania